Dušan Matović (born 8 July 1983) is a former Serbian footballer.

Career
He has played for Tatran Prešov, ŽP Šport Podbrezová, Inter Bratislava.

References

External links
 
 

1983 births
Living people
Footballers from Belgrade
Serbian footballers
Association football defenders
Serbian expatriate footballers
FK Dorćol players
1. FC Tatran Prešov players
FK Železiarne Podbrezová players
FK Inter Bratislava players
FK Ekranas players
Hapoel Ironi Kiryat Shmona F.C. players
Beitar Jerusalem F.C. players
Hapoel Kfar Saba F.C. players
FC Minsk players
FK Voždovac players
Hapoel Bnei Lod F.C. players
Sektzia Ness Ziona F.C. players
2. Liga (Slovakia) players
Slovak Super Liga players
Israeli Premier League players
Belarusian Premier League players
Liga Leumit players
Expatriate footballers in Slovakia
Expatriate footballers in Lithuania
Expatriate footballers in Israel
Expatriate footballers in Belarus
Serbian expatriate sportspeople in Lithuania
Serbian expatriate sportspeople in Slovakia
Serbian expatriate sportspeople in Israel
Serbian expatriate sportspeople in Belarus